"River Man" is the second listed song from Nick Drake's 1969 album Five Leaves Left. According to Drake's manager, Joe Boyd, Drake thought of the song as the centrepiece of the album. In 2004 the song was remastered and released as a 7" vinyl and as enhanced CD single including a video to the song by Tim Pope.

Musical structure and lyrics
The song is in a 5/4 time signature and is one of the few songs Drake wrote to be played in standard tuning. The string arrangement was composed by Harry Robertson (aka Harry Robinson), after Drake's friend Robert Kirby felt he couldn't compose it alone, although he did most of the arrangements on Five Leaves Left. 

Drake did not reveal the identity of the 'Betty' character in the lyrics, although Trevor Dann speculated that she may have been drawn from Betty Foy, a character in Wordsworth's "The Idiot Boy", a poem Drake had studied while attending Cambridge.<ref name="Dann">Dann, Trevor. Darker than the Deepest Sea: The Search for Nick Drake (2006), (Hardback) Portrait. </ref> However, the only similarity to the poem is the existence of a Betty.

Covers
The song has been covered numerous times.

R. Stevie Moore recorded the song in 1987, which later appeared on the Nick Drake tribute album CD Brittle Days (Imaginary Records UK, 1992).

The first 1000 copies of Sidi Bou Said's 1993 album Broooch included a bonus 7", of which a recording of River Man is featured on the b-side.

The American jazz singer Andy Bey included an arrangement of the song with a string section, guitar and bass on his 1998 album Shades of Bey (Evidence Music). Bey used what he called a 'soft palette' singing technique. Music producer Herb Jordan brought the song to Bey's attention, the success of which brought Bey and Nick Drake a new and wider audience.

The song was also part of jazz pianist Brad Mehldau's trio repertoire; it is featured on his 1998 album Songs: The Art of the Trio Volume Three, an over 11-minute-long improvisation on Progression: The Art of the Trio, Vol. 5 recorded live at the Village Vanguard in 2000, and in another concert slightly shorter solo interpretation recorded in 2003 Live in Tokyo.
Other jazz versions of the song include a vocal version by Claire Martin from her 1999 album Take My Heart.

The German alternative rock band Blackmail covered the song on their 1999 album Science Fiction.

British folk musician Norma Waterson included a cover of "River Man" on her second solo album The Very Thought of You in 1999. The song was paired with a cover of John Martyn's "Solid Air", originally dedicated to Drake on Martyn's 1973 album Solid Air. Accompanying Norma Waterson were Richard Thompson and Danny Thompson who were both on the original Five Leaves Left album. Danny was also the double bass player on many John Martyn albums from that period.

Australian band Elixir recorded a version for their 2003 self-titled album.

Becky Unthank interpreted the song on Cruel Sister, the 2005 album by Rachel Unthank and the Winterset.

The Swingle Singers included vocal cover of the song on their album Ferris Wheels in 2009.

An oriental version of "River Man" was provided by singer Natacha Atlas in 2010 for her album Mounqaliba.

An interpretation by the Canadian singer Patricia O'Callaghan is featured on her 2011 album with the Gryphon Trio, Broken Hearts & Madmen.

Jazz singer Kurt Elling is featured on "River Man" on the album Rhythm Sessions by guitarist Lee Ritenour (Concord, 2012).

On Joe Boyd Presents Way to Blue: The Songs of Nick Drake (Navigator, 2013), a compilation which features a new vocal interpretation by Teddy Thompson over Harry Robinson's original string arrangement.

Singer Lizz Wright recorded her version of the song on her 2015 album Freedom & Surrender featuring Till Brönner on trumpet.

Benjamin Clementine included his version of the song in bonus tracks of his debut At Least for Now (Deluxe) album.

British jazz singer Zoe  Gilby covered it in her 2018 album with bassist Andy Champion.

Chrissie Hynde recorded the song for her 2019 jazz collection "Valve Bone Woe".

Robyn Hitchcock covered the song on his 2020 album The Man Downstairs: Demos & Rarities''.

Track listing

2004 CD

 "River Man"
 "Day Is Done" (by Norah Jones and the Charlie Hunter Band)
 "River Man" (video by Tim Pope)

2004 7"

 "River Man"
 "River Man" (demo version)

References

2004 singles
Nick Drake songs
Island Records singles
Song recordings produced by Joe Boyd
Natacha Atlas songs
1969 songs
Songs written by Nick Drake